Caluire-et-Cuire is a commune in the Metropolis of Lyon in Auvergne-Rhône-Alpes region in eastern France.

It is the fifth-largest suburb of the city of Lyon, and lies 4 km north-by-east of Lyon.

Population

Neighbourhoods
 Le Bourg
 Vassieux
 Cuire-le-Bas (quarter)
 Cuire-le-Haut (quarter)
 Saint-Clair
 Le Vernay
 Montessuy
 Bissardon

See also
 Parc Saint-Clair

References

External links
 Town council website (in French)

Communes of Lyon Metropolis
Lyonnais